The Kantoh Collegiate American Football Association is an American college football league made up of colleges and universities in the Kanto region of Japan.

Overview
The Kantoh League is a major college football league in eastern Japan. The league is divided into seven divisions.

The winner of the league goes on to play in the Koshien Bowl against a team from the West Japan.  The winner of the bowl may advance to play the champion of the X-League in the Rice Bowl.

Member schools

Division 1
Prior to the 2014 season, the Kantoh league had two conferences. The winners of each conference would then play in the Azuma Bowl, to determine league champion. Starting in 2014, the league switched to a two division format, the Top 8 and Big 8. With the new format, there would be no championship game and the Top 8 conference would be the highest level of play, making the winner of that division the overall conference champion.

Top 8

Big 8

Division 2

Block A

Block B

Division 3

A Block

B Block

C Block

D Block

Area League

A Block

B Block

C Block

Medical and Dental Division

1st Division

2nd Division

A Block

B Block

References

External links
 

American football in Japan
American football leagues
College athletics conferences in Japan